Yurgamyshsky District is an administrative and municipal district (raion), one of the twenty-four in Kurgan Oblast, Russia. It is located in the center of the oblast. Its administrative center is the urban locality (an urban-type settlement) of Yurgamysh. Population:  24,666 (2002 Census);  The population of Yurgamysh accounts for 36.5% of the district's total population.

References

Notes

Sources

Districts of Kurgan Oblast